William Black Homestead is a historic home located at New Cumberland in Cumberland County, Pennsylvania. It was built about 1776, and consists of a -story, 3-bay, fieldstone main section with a gable roof, and a 1-story kitchen wing.  The house was restored in 1960.  A large one-story frame wing was added in 1975, containing modern amenities.

It was listed on the National Register of Historic Places in 1977.

References 

Houses on the National Register of Historic Places in Pennsylvania
Houses completed in 1776
Houses in Cumberland County, Pennsylvania
National Register of Historic Places in Cumberland County, Pennsylvania